St Callixtus College, is a private Catholic primary and secondary school, located in La Paz, Bolivia. The school was founded by the Society of Jesus in 1882, at the instigation of Monsignor Calixto Clavijo, and in his honour named for the third century martyr Pope Callixtus I. 

The school began in the residence of Marshal Andrés de Santa Cruz, now a national monument. The Jesuits began teaching with around 40 students. Over the years other works became associated with the Jesuit college including San Calixto Observatory.

Also, the school's Radio Fides was a pioneer in the business, beginning broadcasting in 1939.

See also

 Catholic Church in Bolivia
 Education in Bolivia
 List of Jesuit schools

References  

Jesuit primary schools in Bolivia
Schools in La Paz
Jesuit secondary schools in Bolivia
Educational institutions established in 1882
1882 establishments in Bolivia